The Lightning–Panthers rivalry, also known as the Battle of Florida, is an American professional ice hockey rivalry between the Tampa Bay Lightning and the Florida Panthers. Both the Lightning and the Panthers compete in the National Hockey League (NHL)'s Atlantic Division (and both were temporarily placed in the Central Division for the 2020–21 season). In past seasons, the rivalry has been recognized in a trophy known as the Governor's Cup, also called the Sunshine Cup and later the Nextel Cup Challenge.

Origins
Both the Lightning and the Panthers were borne out of the National Hockey League's expansion into the southeast in the early 1990s. Aside from a few abortive attempts to bring minor league hockey to Florida (the Tropical Hockey League of the 1930s, and Jacksonville Rockets and Barons of the 1960s/70s); these were the first professional hockey franchises in the Sunshine State. Tampa Bay began play in the 1992-93 season, with Florida joining the league a year later for the 1993-94 season.

The new Panthers team immediately drew ire from Lightning fans, who objected to the Miami-based franchise claiming the geographical designation of Florida. They also held scorn for Panthers owner Wayne Huizenga, who, as owner of the Florida Marlins baseball team, was regarded as having sabotaged Tampa Bay's efforts to land an expansion team. To make matters worse, the "Florida Panthers" name had originally been used for a failed Tampa-based expansion bid, before Huizenga bought the rights and used it for his NHL team.

Lightning founder and general manager Phil Esposito saw the Panthers as an opportunity to drive ticket sales. "It's going to be great for us bringing a team to Miami because now we're getting somebody our fans can really hate," he said. Esposito, along with Tampa coach Terry Crisp, began making disparaging remarks about the Panthers organization, referring to them as "pussycats". All of this upset Florida general manager Bobby Clarke, who in his playing days was a former teammate of Crisp's (and rival of Esposito's). Clarke retorted that Esposito shouldn't call anyone a "pussycat", considering "the way he used to play." Shortly afterwards, Esposito jokingly gave Clarke a kiss on the cheek on a live television interview, incensing the Florida GM. Though Crisp later played the episode off as merely part of the entertainment aspect of the sport, Esposito would continue to refer to "the stinking Panthers" for years to come.

History

First meetings
In the first of four preseason meetings at the Lakeland Civic Center, 3,876 fans watched Tampa Bay defeat Florida, 4–3 on September 16, 1993. The teams' first regular season meeting came on October 9, 1993. That proved to be historic for two reasons, as 27,227 onlookers witnessed the Panthers earn their first ever win, 2–0, at the cavernous ThunderDome. That attendance mark remains the NHL record for a regular season game not played as part of the NHL Stadium Series, NHL Winter Classic or NHL Heritage Classic. Initially, the Lightning refused to recognize the Panther's geographical designation, billing the series as one against the "Miami Panthers" on tickets and scoreboards.

Though they were both expansion teams, the Panthers enjoyed success far earlier than the Lightning did. Under head coach Roger Neilson, Florida embraced the defensively-minded game that would become prevalent in the dead puck era. In , their first season, the Panthers finished just two points below .500, just missing out on a final 1994 playoff spot. They were a point out of playoff contention at the end of the lockout-shortened 1994–95 season, finally making it in 1996. That year, the Panthers made a run to the Stanley Cup Finals, losing to the Colorado Avalanche (another team making its first Finals appearance). The Lightning also edged a postseason spot in 1996, but were beaten by Philadelphia in the first round. This success, however, was clouded by an inattentive, scandal-ridden ownership group that led to the team being investigated by the Internal Revenue Service. In , Tampa became the first team in NHL history to post four straight 50-loss seasons.

During his tenure as head coach, Neilson downplayed the importance of the rivalry to the successful Panthers team—while using crude language to refer to Lightning fans. "Not being a Floridian, I can't be sure of this, but I think the 'Tampons' , or whatever you call them, that they dislike Miami a lot more than Miami dislikes them. They get very upset with Miami. I'm talking about Tampa itself as a city, and I think it's the same with the team."

Mixed success and cooled rivalry

The two teams saw reversed fortunes in the early 2000s. Under a new ownership group and head coach John Tortorella, the Lightning acquired a core of young talent, including goaltender Nikolai Khabibulin and forwards Martin St. Louis and Vincent Lecavalier. By the 2002–03 season, they won the division and then the first round of the playoffs, only to lose to the eventual champions, the New Jersey Devils. In , the Lightning again made the playoffs, narrowly defeating Montreal, Philadelphia, and finally Calgary for their first Stanley Cup victory. Meanwhile, the Panthers continued to languish near the bottom of the division; after 2001, they would go 11 years without a playoff berth.

The Panthers continued their playoff drought into the 2010s, with a sole First Round appearance in the 2016 Stanley Cup playoffs. Meanwhile, the Lightning, with a new core built around Steven Stamkos and Victor Hedman, became a perennial playoff contender. Under head coach Jon Cooper, Tampa took playoff berths in 2011, 2014, 2015, 2016, 2018, and 2019; in 2015, they made it as far that the Cup Finals, losing to the Chicago Blackhawks in six games.

Although they'd been in the same division every season for more than two decades, and faced one another more than any other opponent, players and coaches alike acknowledged that a true ice hockey rivalry— in the spirit of classics like the Blackhawks–Red Wings, or even contemporaries like the Kings–Sharks—had failed to materialize. At the very least, the rivalry had gone dormant from a lack of playoff meetings, compounded by Tampa's dominance and Florida's irrelevance in the latter half of the 2010s.

Playoff success and division contention
The Panthers returned to the playoffs in the 2020 Stanley Cup playoffs, which were expanded due to the COVID-19 pandemic forcing a shortened ; in the Qualifying Round, they were defeated in four games by the New York Islanders. The Islanders would go on to lose in the Conference Finals to the Lightning, which won their second Stanley Cup against the Dallas Stars. In the aftermath of the 2020 playoffs, the Panthers hired general manager Bill Zito, who managed to aggressively rebuild the team into a powerhouse of the Atlantic Division.

The 2021 Stanley Cup playoffs would be the first time the teams met in the postseason. Tampa Bay won the first-ever playoff game between them, 5–4, as well as the first-ever playoff series by a count of four games to two. The Lightning would go on to win their second consecutive Stanley Cup.

We hate each other and you can see it in our games. They bring out the best of us and we do the same with them. We want to be better than they are." During the season, the Panthers dominated the Atlantic, with the Lightning falling to third. However, in their last regular season meeting on April 24, the Lightning managed to snap a franchise-record 13-game Panthers win streak. That same game saw the two teams combine for 90 penalty minutes. Four Panthers were ejected, including head coach Andrew Brunette, while Ryan Lomberg was suspended one game for instigating.

The two teams would meet again in the second round of the 2022 Stanley Cup playoffs. The Panthers had come off a franchise record-breaking regular season, finishing first in the NHL standings to win their first ever Presidents' Trophy. The Panthers had also broken their 26-year drought of not winning a playoff series, defeating the Washington Capitals in six games. However, the Lightning, who were coming off beating the Toronto Maple Leafs in seven games, would once again get the better of their in-state rivals. En route to a third straight Finals appearance, the Lightning swept the Panthers in four games; Ross Colton, with 3.8 seconds left in Game 2, scored a dramatic game-winner to give Tampa a 2–0 series lead coming back to home ice, and goaltender Andrei Vasilevskiy wound up only allowing three goals in the series.

Some commentators viewed the 2022 matchup as disappointing, especially considering the high expectations for the series. However, Matthew Tkachuk, upon being traded to Florida from the Calgary Flames, compared the Battle of Florida to the Battle of Alberta: "I hate Edmonton, but I hate Tampa more now." He added that the Panthers would not be discouraged by their swift playoff exit at the hands of their intrastate rivals: "They're the team to beat. It seems like for us we're going to have to go through them at some point, so I'm excited for that challenge. They know what it takes to win, and were going to learn that."

Trophy
That first regular season game also saw the introduction of a 15-pound trophy for the winner of the season series, the Sunshine Cup. Presented by the Sunshine Network (the cable broadcast partner for both clubs), it was the first—and to date, only—NHL trophy to be contested by two specific teams, a phenomenon more associated with regional college football rivalries. For the 2003–04 season, it was reintroduced as the Nextel Cup Challenge by the two clubs' marketing departments, though that iteration also lasted only one season. Both cups were intended to raise money for the teams' charitable foundations.

In 2014, Florida Governor Rick Scott announced a second revival of the series winner trophy, now called the Governor's Cup. Specifically the cup's creation was described as an aim to increase the popularity of ice hockey within the state of Florida, as well as supporting youth hockey. The first Governor's Cup was won by the Lightning; however, the trophy has not been awarded since 2014.

Results
The winner of the season series is determined by the total number of points earned between the two teams in head-to-head matchups. Two points are awarded for a win, one point is awarded for losing in overtime or a shootout, and no points are awarded for a loss in regulation. Scores of games won by the series winning team are in bold. Prior to the 1999–2000 NHL season teams were not awarded a point for a loss in overtime and matches that ended in a tie resulted in each team earning one point in the standings. Only thrice in the rivalry has a team swept the season series. Florida did so in 1998–99, while Tampa Bay achieved it in 2013–14 and again in 2018–19.

As of the 2022–23 season the Panthers hold an edge of 16–12–1 in terms of season series wins. Tampa Bay has won the season series four times in a row on two occasions, and the Panthers have done so once. Tampa Bay has won both playoff series.
{| class="wikitable"
!Season
!Winner (points)
!Game 1
!Game 2
!Game 3
!Game 4
!Game 5
!Game 6
!Game 7
!Game 8
|-
| 1993–94 || style="text-align:center; background:#C8102E;"|Florida Panthers (8–2)
|align="center" |2–0
|align="center" |3–3 (OT)
|align="center" |2–1(OT)
|align="center" |3–1
|align="center" |1–1 (OT)
|bgcolor=cccccc|
|bgcolor=cccccc|
|bgcolor=cccccc|
|-
| 1994–95 || style="text-align:center; background:#C8102E;"|Florida Panthers (6–2)
|align="center" |2–3
|align="center" |4–2
|align="center" |4–1
|align="center" |4–1
|bgcolor=cccccc|
|bgcolor=cccccc|
|bgcolor=cccccc|
|bgcolor=cccccc|
|-
|1995–96 ||style="text-align:center; background:#cccccc;"|no winner (6–6)
|style="text-align:center; background:#C8102E;" |4–1
|style="text-align:center; background:#C8102E;" |7–2
|style="text-align:center; background:#C8102E;" |5–3
|style="text-align:center; background:#00205B;"| 4–2
|style="text-align:center; background:#00205B;"| 2–1
|style="text-align:center; background:#00205B;"| 2–1
|bgcolor=cccccc|
|bgcolor=cccccc|
|-
| 1996–97 || style="text-align:center; background:#C8102E;"|Florida Panthers (6–4)
|align="center" |3–3 (OT)
|align="center" |3–2
|align="center" |5–2
|align="center" |0–2
|align="center" |1–1 (OT)
|bgcolor=cccccc|
|bgcolor=cccccc|
|bgcolor=cccccc|
|-
| 1997–98 || style="text-align:center; background:#C8102E;"|Florida Panthers (6–4)
|align="center" |2–1
|align="center" |2–2 (OT)
|align="center" |2–0
|align="center" |1–5
|align="center" |2–2 (OT)
|bgcolor=cccccc|
|bgcolor=cccccc|
|bgcolor=cccccc|
|-
| 1998–99 || style="text-align:center; background:#C8102E;"|Florida Panthers (10–0)
|align="center" |4–1
|align="center" |2–1
|align="center" |3–1
|align="center" |1–0
|align="center" |6–2
|bgcolor=cccccc|
|bgcolor=cccccc|
|bgcolor=cccccc|
|-
| 1999–2000 || style="text-align:center; background:#C8102E;"|Florida Panthers (9–1)
|align="center" |6–1
|align="center" |7–5
|align="center" |5–2
|align="center" |4–3
|align="center" |3–3 (OT)
|bgcolor=cccccc|
|bgcolor=cccccc|
|bgcolor=cccccc|
|-
| 2000–01 || style="text-align:center; background:#00205B;"|Tampa Bay Lightning (8–4)
|align="center" |2–1
|align="center" |1–2 (OT)
|align="center" |2–3 (OT)
|align="center" |4–3
|align="center" |4–2
|bgcolor=cccccc|
|bgcolor=cccccc|
|bgcolor=cccccc|
|-
| 2001–02 || style="text-align:center; background:#00205B;"|Tampa Bay Lightning (6–5)
|align="center" |0–5
|align="center" |3–2
|align="center" |1–3
|align="center" |3–2
|align="center" |3–2 (OT)
|bgcolor=cccccc|
|bgcolor=cccccc|
|bgcolor=cccccc|
|-
| 2002–03 || style="text-align:center; background:#00205B;"|Tampa Bay Lightning (8–3)
|align="center" |4–3 (OT)
|align="center" |6–1
|align="center" |4–4 (OT)
|align="center" |3–1
|align="center" |1–1 (OT)
|bgcolor=cccccc|
|bgcolor=cccccc|
|bgcolor=cccccc|
|-
| 2003–04 || style="text-align:center; background:#00205B;"|Tampa Bay Lightning (7–5)
|align="center" |0–4
|align="center" |2–2 (OT)
|align="center" |1–2
|align="center" |3–2
|align="center" |5–3
|align="center" |4–3
|bgcolor=cccccc|
|bgcolor=cccccc|
|-
| 2004–05 || style="text-align:center; background:#cccccc;"|NHL lockout (no season)
|bgcolor=cccccc|
|bgcolor=cccccc|
|bgcolor=cccccc|
|bgcolor=cccccc|
|bgcolor=cccccc|
|bgcolor=cccccc|
|bgcolor=cccccc|
|bgcolor=cccccc|
|-
| 2005–06 || style="text-align:center; background:#C8102E;"|Florida Panthers (12–6)
|align="center" |2–0
|align="center" |1–2
|align="center" |3–2 (OT)
|align="center" |8–2
|align="center" |6–5 (OT)
|align="center" |4–2
|align="center" |1–4
|align="center" |6–3
|-
| 2006–07 || style="text-align:center; background:#C8102E;"|Florida Panthers (11–7)
|align="center" |3–2
|align="center" |1–4
|align="center" |4–6
|align="center" |5–4 (OT)
|align="center" |2–3 (SO)
|align="center" |6–2
|align="center" |5–2
|align="center" |7–2
|-
| 2007–08 || style="text-align:center; background:#00205B;"|Tampa Bay Lightning (8–8)#
|align="center" |2–1
|align="center" |4–6
|align="center" |3–4
|align="center" |3–1
|align="center" |5–3
|align="center" |2–3
|align="center" |2–4
|align="center" |3–1
|-
| 2008–09 || style="text-align:center; background:#C8102E;"|Florida Panthers (8–7)
|align="center" |4–0
|align="center" |4–3 (SO)
|align="center" |3–4 (SO)
|align="center" |4–6
|align="center" |4–3
|align="center" |3–4 (SO)
|bgcolor=cccccc|
|bgcolor=cccccc|
|-
| 2009–10 || style="text-align:center; background:#C8102E;"|Florida Panthers (7–6)
|align="center" |2–3
|align="center" |3–2
|align="center" |5–2
|align="center" |5–2
|align="center" |3–4 (SO)
|align="center" |1–3
|bgcolor=cccccc|
|bgcolor=cccccc|
|-
| 2010–11 || style="text-align:center; background:#C8102E;"|Florida Panthers (9–7)
|align="center" |6–0
|align="center" |4–3 (SO)
|align="center" |1–2 (SO)
|align="center" |3–2 (SO)
|align="center" |4–3 (OT)
|align="center" |2–4
|bgcolor=cccccc|
|bgcolor=cccccc|
|-
| 2011–12 || style="text-align:center; background:#00205B;"|Tampa Bay Lightning (9–6)
|align="center" |2–3 (SO)
|align="center" |4–7
|align="center" |4–3 (SO)
|align="center" |2–1 (OT)
|align="center" |5–1
|align="center" |6–3
|bgcolor=cccccc|
|bgcolor=cccccc|
|-
| 2012–13 || style="text-align:center; background:#00205B;"|Tampa Bay Lightning (7–5)
|align="center" |5–2
|align="center" |6–5 (OT)
|align="center" |3–2
|align="center" |2–3 (SO)
|align="center" |3–5
|bgcolor=cccccc|
|bgcolor=cccccc|
|bgcolor=cccccc|
|-
| 2013–14 || style="text-align:center; background:#00205B;"|Tampa Bay Lightning (8–1)
|align="center" |7–2
|align="center" |4–3 (SO)
|align="center" |6–1
|align="center" |5–4
|bgcolor=cccccc|
|bgcolor=cccccc|
|bgcolor=cccccc|
|bgcolor=cccccc|
|-
| 2014–15 || style="text-align:center; background:#00205B;"|Tampa Bay Lightning (6–3)
|align="center" |2–1 (OT)
|align="center" |3–4
|align="center" |4–3
|align="center" |4–0
|bgcolor=cccccc|
|bgcolor=cccccc|
|bgcolor=cccccc|
|bgcolor=cccccc|
|-
| 2015–16 || style="text-align:center; background:#C8102E;"|Florida Panthers (8–3)
|align="center" |5–4 (SO)
|align="center" |1–0
|align="center" |1–3
|align="center" |5–2
|align="center" |5–2
|bgcolor=cccccc|
|bgcolor=cccccc|
|bgcolor=cccccc|
|-
| 2016–17 || style="text-align:center; background:#C8102E;"|Florida Panthers (5–5)#
|align="center" |3–4 (SO)
|align="center" |3–1
|align="center" |2–1 (OT)
|align="center" |2–3
|bgcolor=cccccc|
|bgcolor=cccccc|
|bgcolor=cccccc|
|bgcolor=cccccc|
|-
| 2017–18 || style="text-align:center; background:#00205B;"|Tampa Bay Lightning (6–3)
|align="center" |5–3
|align="center" |4–5
|align="center" |8–5
|align="center" |5–4 (OT)
|bgcolor=cccccc|
|bgcolor=cccccc|
|bgcolor=cccccc|
|bgcolor=cccccc|
|-
| 2018–19 || style="text-align:center; background:#00205B;"|Tampa Bay Lightning (8–2)
|align="center" |2–1 (SO)
|align="center" |7–3
|align="center" |5–4 (OT)
|align="center" |5–2
|bgcolor=cccccc|
|bgcolor=cccccc|
|bgcolor=cccccc|
|bgcolor=cccccc|
|-
| 2019–20 || style="text-align:center; background:#00205B;"|Tampa Bay Lightning (6–2)
|align="center" |5–2
|align="center" |3–4
|align="center" |2–1
|align="center" |6–1
|bgcolor=cccccc|
|bgcolor=cccccc|
|bgcolor=cccccc|
|bgcolor=cccccc|
|-
| 2020–21 || style="text-align:center; background:#C8102E;"|<span style="color:#FFFFFF;">Florida Panthers (11–6)</span>
|align="center" |5–2
|align="center" |1–6
|align="center" |6–4
|align="center" |3–5
|align="center" |2–3 (OT)
|align="center" |5–3
|align="center" |5–1
|align="center" |4–0
|-
| 2021–22 || style="text-align:center; background:#C8102E;"|Florida Panthers (5–4)
|align="center" |4–1
|align="center" |2–3 (OT)
|align="center" |9–3
|align="center" |4–8
|bgcolor=cccccc|
|bgcolor=cccccc|
|bgcolor=cccccc|
|bgcolor=cccccc|
|-
| 2022–23 || style="text-align:center; background:#CF102D;"|Florida Panthers (5–4)
|align="center" |2–3 (OT)
|align="center" |1–4
|align="center" |7–1
|align="center" |4–1
|bgcolor=cccccc|
|bgcolor=cccccc|
|bgcolor=cccccc|
|bgcolor=cccccc|
|}#Winner by tie-breaker''

Postseason

See also
National Hockey League rivalries
Buccaneers–Dolphins rivalry
Heat–Magic rivalry
Fort Lauderdale–Tampa Bay rivalry
Citrus Series

Notes

References

Tampa Bay Lightning
Florida Panthers
2013 establishments in Florida
National Hockey League rivalries
Ice hockey in Florida
Sports rivalries in Florida